The 2016 Gimcheon Open ATP Challenger is a professional tennis tournament played on hard courts. It is the third edition of the tournament which is part of the 2016 ATP Challenger Tour. It takes place in Gimcheon, Korea between 18 and 24 July 2016.

Singles main-draw entrants

Seeds

 1 Rankings are as of July 11, 2016.

Other entrants
The following players received wildcards into the singles main draw:
  Kim Young-seok
  Park Ui-sung
  Seol Jae-min
  Shin Sanhui

The following player received entry as an alternate:
  Sidharth Rawat

The following players received entry from the qualifying draw:
  Nam Hyun-woo
  Daniel Yoo
  Wang Chuhan
  Max Purcell

Doubles main-draw entrants

Seeds

1 Rankings as of July 11, 2016.

Other entrants 
The following pairs received wildcards into the doubles main draw:
 Temur Ismailov /  Park Ui-sung

Champions

Singles

  Max Purcell def.  Andrew Whittington, 3–6, 7–6(8–6), 5–1 retired

Doubles

  Hsieh Cheng-peng /  Yang Tsung-hua def.  Nicolás Barrientos /  Ruben Gonzales, Walkover

References
ITF Website

External links

Gimcheon Open ATP Challenger
2016 in South Korean tennis
Gimcheon Open ATP Challenger